The French Alps are the portions of the Alps mountain range that stand within France, located in the Auvergne-Rhône-Alpes and Provence-Alpes-Côte d'Azur regions. While some of the ranges of the French Alps are entirely in France, others, such as the Mont Blanc massif, are shared with Switzerland and Italy.

At , Mont Blanc (Italian: Monte Bianco), on the France–Italy border, is the highest mountain in the Alps, and the highest Western European mountain.

Notable towns in the French Alps include Grenoble, Chamonix, Annecy, Chambéry, Évian-les-Bains and Albertville.

Ranges and summits

Ski areas

The largest connected ski areas are:

 Les Trois Vallées (Courchevel, Méribel, La Tania, Brides-les-Bains, Saint-Martin-de-Belleville, Les Menuires, Val Thorens and Orelle): 338  slopes, 600 km of pistes.
 Portes du Soleil (Avoriaz, Châtel, Morzine, Les Gets, Saint-Jean d'Aulps, La Chapelle d'Abondance, Abondance, Montriond, Swiss resorts): 288  slopes, 650 km of slopes not entirely connected.
 Paradiski (La Plagne, Peisey-Vallandry, Les Arcs), Champagny-en-Vanoise: 239  slopes, 420 km of slopes.
 Via Lattea (Montgenèvre, Italian resorts): 214 slopes, 400 km of slopes.
 Évasion Mont-Blanc (Combloux, Megève, Saint-Gervais, Saint-Nicolas-de-Véroce, Les Contamines Monjoie):  183 slopes, 420 km of slopes not entirely connected.
 Espace Killy (Tignes, Val-d'Isère): 137  slopes, 300 km of slopes.
 Grand Massif (Flaine, Les Carroz, Morillon, Samoëns, Sixt): 134  slopes, 265 km of slopes.
 Les Aravis (La Clusaz, Manigod, La Croix Fry, Merdassier, Le Grand-Bornand): 133 slopes, 220 km of slopes not entirely connected.
 Les Grandes Rousses (L'Alpe d'Huez, Vaujany, Auris-en-Oisans, Oz-en-Oisans, Villard-Reculas): 117 slopes, 236 km of slopes.
 Serre Chevalier: 111  slopes, 250 km of slopes.
 La Forêt Blanche (Risoul, Vars): 104 slopes, 180 km of slopes.
 Les Sybelles (Le Corbier, La Toussuire, Les Bottières, Saint-Jean-d'Arves, Saint-Sorlin-d'Arves, Saint-Colomban-des-Villards): 96  slopes, 310 km of slopes.
 Valloire and Valmeinier: 83 slopes, 150 km of slopes.
 Grand Domaine (Valmorel, Saint-François-Longchamp): 82 slopes, 150 km of slopes
 Espace San Bernardo (La Rosière, La Thuile - Italy): 73  slopes, 150 km of slopes.
 Les Deux Alpes and La Grave: 69  slopes, 220 km of slopes. (+ Freeride Zone)

The other large  ski areas are:

 Le Val d'Arly (Praz-sur-Arly, Notre-Dame-de-Bellecombe, Flumet): 150 km of slopes.
 L'Espace Cristal (Les Saisies, Crest-Voland): 80 km of slopes
 L'Espace Diamant is a combination of Espace Val d'Arly and Espace Cristal with 185 km of slopes
 Villard-de-Lans et Corrençon-en-Vercors: 125 km of slopes
 Valberg - Beuil les Launes: 90 km of slopes
 Espace Lumière (Pra-Loup, Val d'Allos): 170 km of slopes
 Superdévoluy - La Joue du Loup: 100 km of slopes
 Orcières-Merlette 150 km of slopes

Activities
A range of winter and summer activities are available in the French Alps. In the winter, these include skiing and snowboarding as well as alternatives such as snowshoeing, sledging. There is a range of other activities that happen such as gliding which most happens during the summer months. Summer activities include hiking, mountaineering, biking and rock climbing.

Gallery

See also
 La Grande Odyssée
 1924 Winter Olympics
 1968 Winter Olympics
 1992 Winter Olympics
 List of highest paved roads in Europe
 List of mountain passes
 List of national parks in the Alps
 List of ski areas and resorts in Europe

References

Bibliography
 Raoul Blanchard (1938–1956), Les Alpes Occidentales. Paris: Édition Arthaud. (French)
 Roger Frison-Roche (1964), Les montagnes de la terre. Paris: Flammarion. (French)
 Sergio Marazzi (2005), Atlante Orografico delle Alpi. SOIUSA. Pavone Canavese (TO): Priuli & Verlucca editori.  (Italian)
 Sergio Marazzi,  La "Suddivisione orografica internazionale unificata del Sistema Alpino" (SOIUSA) - article with maps and illustrations, PDF (Italian)

 
Mountain ranges of the Alps
Alps
Mountain ranges of Auvergne-Rhône-Alpes
Mountain ranges of Provence-Alpes-Côte d'Azur